Tetratheca harperi, also known as Jackson Tetratheca, is a species of flowering plant in the quandong family that is endemic to Australia.

Description
The species grows as a multi-stemmed shrub to 20–40 cm in height. The tiny leaves are 2 mm long, and mature branches are leafless. The flowers each have four or five pink petals 12 mm long and 6 mm wide, and appear from July to November.

Distribution and habitat
The species is only known from Mount Jackson, north of the town of Southern Cross, within the Coolgardie IBRA bioregion of south-west Western Australia. The plants grow on stony loam soils in crevices on rocky outcrops.

Conservation
The species has been listed as Vulnerable under Australia's EPBC Act. Threats include mineral exploration and mining, invasive weeds, inappropriate fire regimes and grazing by feral goats.

References

harperi
Eudicots of Western Australia
Oxalidales of Australia
Taxa named by Ferdinand von Mueller
Plants described in 1865